Yesterday and Today is a 1966 album by The Beatles.

Yesterday and Today may also refer to:

Yesterday & Today (band), later Y&T, an American rock band
Yesterday and Today (Yesterday and Today album), 1976
Yesterday & Today (Tokio album), 2000
Yesterday and Today (The Field album), 2009
"Yesterday & Today" (Do As Infinity song), 2000
"Yesterday & Today", a song by Yes from the 1969 album Yes

See also
Yesterday (disambiguation)
Today (disambiguation)